Sardella (also Latin for "sardine") is a surname that may refer to:

Ed Sardella, reporter from Denver, Colorado, US
Federico Sardella (born 1988), Argentine footballer
Ferdinando Sardella (born 1960), Swedish academic in the history of religion
Killian Sardella (born 2002), Belgian footballer
Luis Sardella (1911–?), Argentine Olympic boxer

See also
sardella occurs as an element in various scientific names of fish

Surnames